James Irvine (1793–1835) was an educator and Presbyterian minister who served as the second president of Ohio University, located in Athens, Ohio, from 1822 to 1824.

Irvine, a native of Washington County, New York, graduated from Union College, and was hired as a professor of mathematics at Ohio University in 1821.  He became president of the university in 1822, and served only a year before taking a leave of absence due to poor health. Irvine never returned from his leave and resigned in 1824. He was pastor at West Hebron, New York, 1824–1831, and of the Second Presbyterian Church of New York City, 1831–1835. He died in New York City, November 25, 1835.

External links
 Ohio University profile

Ohio University faculty
Presidents of Ohio University
1793 births
1835 deaths
People from Washington County, New York
People from Hebron, New York